Eleven vessels of the British Royal Navy have been named HMS Leopard after the leopard:

  was a 34-gun ship launched in 1635 and captured by the Dutch in 1653.
  was a 54-gun ship launched in 1659, hulked from 1686, and sunk as a breakwater in 1699. John Tyrrell was lieutenant on this ship in 1672.
  was a 6-gun fireship purchased in 1672 and expended the following year at the Battle of Texel. 
  was a 54-gun fourth rate launched in 1703, rebuilt 1721, and broken up 1739.
  was a 50-gun fourth rate in service from 1741 to 1761.
 , famous for her role in the Chesapeake-Leopard Affair, was a 50-gun fourth rate launched in 1790, a troopship from 1812, and wrecked 1814.
  was a 4-gun vessel formerly a Dutch hoy, purchased 1794 and sold 1808.
  was a wooden-hulled paddle frigate, launched 1850 and sold 1867.
  was a  destroyer in service from 1897 to 1919.
 Leopard, launched in 1927, was a French , seized in 1940, transferred to the Free French forces and wrecked off Benghazi on 27 May 1943.
 , launched in 1955, was the lead ship of her class of frigates. She was broken up in 1977.

Royal Navy ship names